Catherine Andrea Giessel, (née Bohms;  born November 9, 1951) is a Republican politician from the U.S. state of Alaska, who has served as a member of the Alaska Senate since 2023 and from 2011 to 2021. From 2013 to 2021, Giessel represented District N in the Alaska Senate, including Northeast Anchorage, Anchorage Hillside and the Turnagain Arm communities of Bird, Girdwood, Indian, and Anchorage, all within the Municipality of Anchorage. First elected in 2010 while identifying with Tea Party values, she has also served as the vice-chair of the state Republican Party and had a career in nursing. Following redistricting, she was elected to a different senate seat in 2012. Giessel serves as chair of the Resources Committee and is a member of the Senate Majority Caucus. After Senate President Pete Kelly was unseated in 2018, Giessel was elected president of the Alaska Senate, a post she held until 2021. Giessel returned to the Alaska Senate in 2023, representing the newly configured District E after defeating incumbent Republican Roger Holland. She will serve as Senate majority leader in the 33rd Legislature, overseeing a coalition caucus of eight Republicans and nine Democrats.

Early life and career
Cathy Giessel was born Catherine Andrea Bohms in Fairbanks, Alaska, on November 9, 1951, the oldest of three daughters (and four children overall) born to Gerald Johnson "Jerry" (1924–2002) and Ruth Odelia (née Bauer, born 1927) Bohms. Jerry Bohms arrived in Alaska in the late 1940s and worked for Wien Alaska Airlines (a predecessor to Wien Air Alaska). Ruth Bohms holds a degree from Gonzaga University School of Law and was admitted before the bars of Alaska and the United States Supreme Court. Ruth Bohms was a candidate for the Alaska Legislature in 1992, running as an Alaskan Independence Party candidate for a Fairbanks-based seat in the Alaska House of Representatives. Giessel graduated from Lathrop High School in Fairbanks and thereafter gained a Bachelor of Science in nursing from the University of Michigan before moving to Anchorage in 1974.

She worked as an advanced nurse practitioner across a variety of clinics in Anchorage and the North Slope Borough and continues to do healthcare consulting, and gained a master's degree in nursing from the University of Alaska Anchorage in 2000. She has been on the Alaska Board of Nursing, serving five years as its chairperson, and also on the Alaska Healthcare Strategy Planning Council. In 2010, she was named an 'exceptional leader' by the National Council of State Boards of Nursing.

Political involvement
Before gaining her Senate seat, Giessel served on Sean Parnell's campaign team during his race against Don Young during the Republican primary for Alaska's congressional seat in 2008.

Alaska Senate

2016: Senate District N election
Giessel was up for reelection in 2016. Due to all the previous issues resulting from redistricting, this would be the first time Giessel was eligible to have a 4-year term. Giessel's initial Democratic challenger, local non-profit executive and advocate Hilary Morgan, dropped out of the senate race early in  2016. Shortly before the filing deadline, longtime registered Democrat and President of the Alaska AFL-CIO, Vince Beltrami emerged, filing to run as an independent. The race became one of the most expensive state senate races in Alaska history. Giessel won the November general election, defeating challenger Vince Beltrami, 51.90% to 47.57%. Giessel again campaigned on positions strongly supporting natural resource development, diversified economic development, right-sizing Alaska state government, the creation of a comprehensive plan to the state government's budget challenges,  and again supported more school choice options for parents of K-12 students. Due to the continued budget shortfall, further reductions in state spending continued as a top priority for the new senate majority caucus. Other priorities of the caucus are plans to implement a state spending limit into law and review of formula driven programs to make additional reforms to the state's most costly programs to get the state budget under control.

Committee assignments
 Resources (chair)
 Special Committee on Arctic Policy (chair)
 Health and Social Services
 State Affairs
 Education
 Legislative Budget and Audit
 Legislative Council (alternate)
 Finance Subcommittee
 Environmental Conservation
 Health & Social Services
 Natural Resources

Caucus memberships
 In-state Gas Caucus
 Outdoor Heritage Caucus

2014: Senate District N election
Though elected in 2012 following redistricting, a challenge to the newly drawn districts caused Giessel to be up for reelection again in 2014. Giessel won the November general election, defeating Democratic challenger Harry Crawford Jr., 54.7% to 44.97%. This time Giessel was elected to a 2-year seat that would be up again for reelection in 2016. Giessel campaigned on the position of pro natural resource development, in-state gasline development, diversified economic development and supported more school choice options for parents of K-12 students. Due to the sharp fall of oil prices and Alaska's ensuing fiscal gap in 2015, the budget and curbing state spending became  top priorities for the new senate majority caucus. Education funding was another top priority for the caucus as well.

Committee assignments
 Resources (chair)
 Special Committee on Arctic Policy (co-chair)
 Health and Social Services (vice-chair)
 Labor and Commerce (vice-chair)
 Education
 Legislative Budget and Audit
 Finance Subcommittee
 Environmental Conservation
 Health & Social Services
 Natural Resources

Caucus memberships
 In-state Gas Caucus
 Outdoor Heritage Caucus

2012: Senate District N election

Though elected in 2010 to serve a four-year term, redistricting led to her being up for election again in 2012 for a new senate seat serving District N. In the August Republican primary, Giessel defeated challenger Joe Arness by 67%. She won the November general election, defeating Independent Ron Devon, the husband of Mudflats author Jeanne Devon, 58.8% to 40.7%. She campaigned on the position of pro natural resource development, in-state gasline development, increased economic development, and oil tax reform. Increasing oil production through oil tax reform was a decisive issue during the 2012 election and became top priority for the new senate majority caucus that was formed subsequently.

Giessel was appointed to chair the Senate Resources committee which moved Governor Parnell's oil tax reform legislation and advanced the Alaska Stand-Alone Pipeline project.

Committee assignments

 Resources (chair)
 Community and Regional Affairs (vice-chair)
 State Affairs (vice-chair)
 Administrative Regulatory Review (vice-chair)
 Legislative Budget and Audit
 Legislative Ethics
 Alaska Arctic Policy Commission
 Finance Subcommittee
 Environmental Conservation
 Natural Resources
 Labor & Workforce Development

Caucus memberships
 In-state Gas Caucus
 Outdoor Heritage Caucus

2010: Senate District P election
Giessel ran for the Senate District P seat in 2010 when Republican incumbent Con Bunde retired after 18 years in the legislature, the last eight in the Senate. She faced two moderates in her party primary: Anchorage assemblywoman Jennifer Johnston and cardiologist Mark Moronell. Taking advantage of the split in the moderate vote she won her party's nomination for the general election – 46% over 28% for Moronell and 25% for Johnston. The Alaska Dispatch, referred to the district election "as [what seems to be] the most important legislative race this year." Giessel identified herself with Tea Party ideals but did not consider herself a Tea Party candidate. In the November election, she beat Democrat Janet Reiser and independent conservative Phil Dziubinski 49% to 39% and 12% respectively. Dziubinski, who had recently retired from a career working for BP, spent over $150,000 of his own money on his campaign.

During her freshman term, Giessel served on the Senate committees on labor & commerce, state affairs, the finance subcommittee on the legislature, and was a member of the Joint In-State Gas Caucus.  She aligned herself with the 'Senate Minority' caucus: a grouping of Republican senators who rejected the dominant bipartisan 'Senate Majority' caucus.

Committee assignments
 Senate Committee on Labor and Commerce
 Senate Committee on State Affairs
 Senate Finance subcommittee on the Legislature

Caucus memberships
 Joint Legislative In-State Gas Caucus
 Joint Legislative Outdoor Heritage Caucus
 Anchorage Caucus

Political positions

In response to a questionnaire sent by the Alaska Family Action group, Giessel conveyed pro-life viewpoints, constitutional limits on benefits for same-sex couples and legislative blocks on the expansion of gambling excepting a referendum.

In the 2011 mid-term Alaska Business Report Card (a grading system run by several Alaska business coalitions judging state officials on how favorable they are to the business community) Giessel received an A+, the only senator to receive the highest grade, and only one of five state legislators in both houses.

National involvement
In 2013, Giessel was appointed to chair the Energy Producing States Coalition (EPSC), a bipartisan group of legislators across 10 states that focuses on energy and transmission development issues. Following a decision by the Interior Department to withhold $110 million in federal mineral revenue sharing payments because of sequestration, the EPSC issued a letter to the House Energy and Commerce Committee leadership denouncing the act, which Giessel signed on to.

Personal life
Giessel is married to Richard and has three children and several grandchildren. She is a member of both the National Rifle Association – which has endorsed her run for re-election   and the Second Amendment Sisters.  She received the Anchorage Republican Woman of the Year award in 2007.

References

External links
 Sen. Giessel Profile - Alaska Senate Majority Site 
 Cathy Giessel at 100 Years of Alaska's Legislature

|-

1951 births
21st-century American politicians
21st-century American women politicians
American women nurses
Living people
Nurses from Alaska
Politicians from Anchorage, Alaska
Politicians from Fairbanks, Alaska
Presidents of the Alaska Senate
Republican Party Alaska state senators
University of Alaska Anchorage alumni
University of Michigan School of Nursing alumni
Women state legislators in Alaska